NA-81 Hafizabad is a newly-created constituency for the National Assembly of Pakistan. It comprises the whole of Hafizabad District and was created by the merger of the old constituencies of NA-102 and NA-103.

Members of Parliament

2018-2022: NA-87 Hafizabad

Election 2018 
General elections were held on 25 July 2018. The total votes polled in this constituency were most in any constituency of Pakistan.

Note: PTI gain shown because PMLN had legislators from both the previous constituencies (NA-102 & NA-103) that merged to give the new NA-87 in the 2018 delimitations.

By-election 2023 
A by-election will be held on 19 March 2023 due to the resignation of Shaukat Ali Bhatti, the previous MNA from this seat.

See also
NA-80 Mandi Bahauddin-II
NA-82 Sargodha-I

References 

Hafizabad